James Hartwell Fair, Jr. (born December 18, 1945) is a former member of the Louisiana House of Representatives from Bienville Parish in north Louisiana. He served as a Democrat in the state House for a single term from 1980 to 1984 during the administration of Governor David C. Treen.

Fair was elected in 1979 to fill the seat vacated by Speaker E.L. "Bubba" Henry of Jonesboro, who ran unsuccessfully that year for governor of Louisiana. Fair was unseated after a single term in the 1983 election by Jimmy L. Long.

References

1946 births
Living people
Members of the Louisiana House of Representatives
People from Bienville Parish, Louisiana
Businesspeople from Louisiana
Louisiana Democrats
Louisiana Republicans